Ladies of the Mob (1928) is a 1928 American silent crime drama film directed by William A. Wellman, produced by Jesse L. Lasky and Adolph Zukor for Famous Players-Lasky, and distributed by Paramount Pictures. The film is based on a story by Ernest Booth. This gangster-themed romantic thriller about a criminal's daughter who tries to reform a petty crook whom she loves featured Clara Bow, Richard Arlen, Mary Alden and Helen Lynch.

No copies of this film are known to survive, and it is listed by most sources as a lost film.

The women's costumes were designed by Travis Banton and Edith Head, both of whom had long, distinguished careers in Hollywood.

Cast
 Clara Bow as Yvonne
 Richard Arlen as Red
 Helen Lynch as Marie
 Mary Alden as Soft Annie
 Carl Gerard as Joe
 Bodil Rosing as The mother
 Lorraine Rivero as Little Yvonne
 James Pierce as The officer

See also
List of lost films

References

External links

Ladies of the Mob at SilentEra

Poster for Ladies of the Mob

1928 films
American silent feature films
American crime drama films
Lost American films
Paramount Pictures films
Films directed by William A. Wellman
American romantic drama films
1928 crime drama films
American black-and-white films
American romantic thriller films
Lost crime drama films
1928 lost films
1928 romantic drama films
1920s American films
Silent romantic drama films
Silent thriller films
Silent American drama films
1920s English-language films